A Perfect Crime is a 1921 American silent comedy-drama film directed by Allan Dwan and starring Monte Blue, Jacqueline Logan, and Stanton Heck. It is not known whether the film survives which suggests it may be lost.

Cast
 Monte Blue as Wally Griggs  
 Jacqueline Logan as Mary Oliver  
 Stanton Heck as Big Bill Thaine  
 Hardee Kirkland as President Halliday  
 Carole Lombard as Griggs' Sister

References

Bibliography
 Wes D. Gehring. Carole Lombard, the Hoosier Tornado. Indiana Historical Society Press, 2003.

External links

1921 films
Films directed by Allan Dwan
American silent feature films
American black-and-white films
1921 comedy-drama films
1920s English-language films
1920s American films
Silent American comedy-drama films